— Columns detailing the features covered by the binding are missing. —

See also 
 List of language bindings for Qt 4
 List of language bindings for GTK+
 List of language bindings for wxWidgets
 List of Qt language bindings from the qt-project.org wiki

References 

Qt (software)